Sierra de Béjar may refer to:
 Sierra de Béjar (mountain range) a mountain range in Spain
 Sierra de Béjar (comarca) a comarca in the province of Salamanca